Jyotsana Srivastava (born 2 May 1937) is an Indian politician and former member of Uttar Pradesh Legislative Assembly representing Varanasi Cantonment four times. She was the wife of veteran BJP leader Harish Chandra Srivastava. In 1986, she completed a doctorate from Kashi Vidyapeeth of Varanasi. She also works as teacher of agriculture in a college. She wrote and published some books like Economical History of England, Political and Economical Views of Rashtra Ratna Shiv Prasad Gupta etc. She belongs to the Kayastha community. She also participated in all movements of party.

References
https://myneta.info › Uttar Pradesh 2012 › VARANASI › VARANASI CANTT.

1938 births
Living people
Politicians from Varanasi
Uttar Pradesh MLAs 2012–2017
Bharatiya Janata Party politicians from Uttar Pradesh